KPSF (1200 AM) is a radio station licensed to Cathedral City, California.  KPSF signed on March 5, 2012. The station shares its transmitter site with sister station KXPS.

On July 11, 2019, KPSF changed their format from business talk to Christian radio, branded as "Pure Radio".

On June 1, 2022, KPSF and KXPS went silent.

References

External links

PSF
2012 establishments in California